Amorphea are members of a taxonomic supergroup that includes the basal Amoebozoa and Obazoa. That latter contains the Opisthokonta, which includes the Fungi, Animals and the Choanomonada, or Choanoflagellates. The taxonomic affinities of the members of this clade were originally described and proposed by Thomas Cavalier-Smith in 2002.

The International Society of Protistologists, the recognised body for taxonomy of protozoa, recommended in 2012 that the term Unikont be changed to Amorphea because the name "Unikont" is based on a hypothesized synapomorphy that the ISP authors and other scientists later rejected.

It includes amoebozoa, opisthokonts, and possibly Apusozoa.

Taxonomic revisions within this group

Cavalier-Smith proposed two new phyla: Sulcozoa, which consists of the subphyla Apusozoa (Apusomonadida and Breviatea), and Varisulca, which includes the subphyla Diphyllatea, Discocelida, Mantamonadidae, Planomonadida and Rigifilida.

Further work by Cavalier-Smith showed that Sulcozoa is paraphyletic. Apusozoa also appears to be paraphyletic. Varisulca has been redefined to include planomonads, Mantamonas and Collodictyon. A new taxon has been created - Glissodiscea - for the planomonads and Mantamonas. Again, the validity of this revised taxonomy awaits confirmation.

Amoebozoa seems to be monophyletic with two major branches: Conosa and Lobosa. Conosa is divided into the aerobic infraphylum Semiconosia (Mycetozoa and Variosea) and secondarily anaerobic Archamoebae. Lobosa consists entirely of non-flagellated lobose amoebae and has been divided into two classes: Discosea, which have flattened cells, and Tubulinea, which has predominantly tube-shaped pseudopodia.

Clade
The group includes eukaryotic cells that, for the most part, have a single emergent flagellum, or are amoebae with no flagella. The unikonts include opisthokonts (animals, fungi, and related forms) and Amoebozoa. By contrast, other well-known eukaryotic groups, which more often have two emergent flagella (although there are many exceptions), are often referred to as bikonts.  Bikonts include Archaeplastida (plants and relatives) and SAR supergroup, the Cryptista, Haptista, Telonemia and picozoa.

Characteristics
The unikonts have a triple-gene fusion that is lacking in the bikonts. The three genes that are fused together in the unikonts, but not bacteria or bikonts, encode enzymes for synthesis of the pyrimidine nucleotides: carbamoyl phosphate synthase, dihydroorotase, aspartate carbamoyltransferase. This must have involved a double fusion, a rare pair of events, supporting the shared ancestry of Opisthokonta and Amoebozoa.

Cavalier-Smith originally proposed that unikonts ancestrally had a single flagellum and single basal body. This is unlikely, however, as flagellated opisthokonts, as well as some flagellated Amoebozoa, including Breviata, actually have two basal bodies, as in typical 'bikonts' (even though only one is flagellated in most unikonts). This paired arrangement can also be seen in the organization of centrioles in typical animal cells. In spite of the name of the group, the common ancestor of all 'unikonts' was probably a cell with two basal bodies.

References

External links

  Tree of Life.org

 
Eukaryote unranked clades